West Valley College is a public community college in Saratoga, California. It is part of the California Community College system.

History
The college was founded as West Valley Junior College in 1963. It was to serve the footprint of the Campbell Union High School District, the Los Gatos-Saratoga Joint Union High School District, and the Santa Clara Unified School District. The district was formed by voter approval in January 1963. The first classes began September 14, 1964. The first campus took over the space of the defunct Campbell Union Grammar School, at 1 East Campbell Avenue near Winchester Boulevard in Campbell across the street from Campbell High School. The grammar school itself was closed because its WPA era buildings were deemed unsafe in the event of an earthquake. While some of the existing buildings used, most of the classrooms were portable, parked on the former playgrounds.

The land for the new campus, where the school is located now was purchased in 1966. Groundbreaking for the new construction was June 15, 1967. Starting in 1968 the first new building was occupied and a few classes transitioned to the new campus, many in temporary classrooms while further permanent structures were built. The transition was completed in 1975.

Campus
The campus occupies  near the West Valley Freeway in Saratoga.

Organization and administration 
West Valley College is part of Silicon Valley's West Valley–Mission Community College District, which also administers Mission College in nearby Santa Clara, in turn part of the California Community Colleges System. The district serves the cities of Saratoga, Campbell, Los Gatos, Monte Sereno, Santa Clara, and San Jose. The district headquarters is on the West Valley College campus.

Academics 
As of 2005, West Valley College offered 61 associate degree programs and 94 certificate programs. As of 2017, the school had a total enrollment of 9,463 students and its faculty had 404 full-time and 168 associate members. From those 9,463 students, 5,721 are returning students from the semester before.

Student demographics
Student percentages are: Hispanic 29%, White 38%, Asian 17%, African-American 4%, Filipino 5%, other 7%.

Athletics
West Valley offers a plethora of men and women sporting activities including: baseball, men's basketball, men's and women's soccer, men's and women's swimming, men's and women's water polo, softball, women's volleyball, women's tennis and beach volleyball. West Valley Athletics is known as the West Valley Vikings, with the mascot being a Viking. Team colors are navy blue, orange and white.

Men's soccer
Winning Percentage of (.715) over the last 10 seasons only losing 48 games while winning 151.
12 Coast Conference Championships since 1998, last being in 2015 where they Four-Peated as champions from 2012-2015.
Nationally ranked 8 seasons since 1998. last being in 2015.

Men's baseball
One of six teams to have won more than 130 games in a span of four seasons.
7 Conference Championships, last being in 2009.
Nine Super Regionals, last being in 2008.
Reached the Final Four in 2008 and was ranked #7 in the nation that same season.

Men's water polo 
West Valley's community college program and in all of California with a multitude of trophies including:
Six State Championships,
Twenty Northern California Championships,
and Twenty-Eight Conference Championships.

Women's softball 
Since 2010, the West Valley softball team has reached the playoffs four times and won two Conference Championships, the last in 2015. The Vikings were CCCAA State Champions in 1990 and 2002. The team received a top eight selection in 2013.

Notable people
 Mark Bingham and Nicole C. Miller, passengers on the United 93 flight during the September 11, 2001 attacks
 Stan Bunger, news anchor on KCBS
 Doug Capilla, Major League Baseball player
 Vicky Galindo, Olympic Silver Medalist and former National Pro Fastpitch second and third baseman for the Chicago Bandits
 Kit Lathrop, former NFL defensive end/defensive tackle
 Cung Le, former International Kickboxing Federation Light Heavyweight World Champion; professional mixed martial artist, former Strikeforce middleweight champion, competed in the UFC's Middleweight Division
 H. Paul Shuch, SETI scientist
 Jason Tarver, NFL assistant linebackers coach for the San Francisco 49ers
 John Hendy, former NFL cornerback San Diego Chargers First Team All Rookie 1985, 2 year starter at Long Beach State 49ers football 1984 College Football All-America Team defensive back.

References

External links
 Official website

 
California Community Colleges
Educational institutions established in 1963
Saratoga, California
Schools accredited by the Western Association of Schools and Colleges
Universities and colleges in Santa Clara County, California
1963 establishments in California
Two-year colleges in the United States